Central Catholic High School, is a Catholic, all-male, non-boarding college preparatory school located in the River North District of Downtown San Antonio, Texas, USA, in the Roman Catholic Archdiocese of San Antonio.

History
The school began as St. Mary's Institute on March 25, 1852, in rented rooms above a blacksmith's shop on Military Plaza. The original faculty consisted of Brother Anthony Edel (Founder, First Superior, and First Principal) from Ohio, three Marianist Brothers from Bordeaux, France (Nicholas Koenig, Jean-Baptiste Laignounse, and Xavier Mauclerc), and Timothy O'Neil, a layman from San Antonio.

The school moved to a new, 2-story building at 112 College Street on March 1, 1853. In 1891, the school was renamed St. Mary's College, reflecting its expansion to include boarders and primary and middle school grades. In 1923, the school added boarding students from St. Louis College and was renamed St. Mary's Academy. The site is now a hotel entryway, recognized by Texas Historical Marker #3819 as the location of Old St. Mary's College, or "The Old Academy."

The third floor was not occupied until 1953. Grade school classes were dropped in 1955. A Dr Pepper bottling plant occupied the northeast corner of the site until 1956. On December 6, 1982, the school was incorporated in the State of Texas as Central Catholic Marianist High School. Upon the assumption by Rev. Joseph Tarrillion, SM, of the presidency, the school's name was changed back to Central Catholic High School. The school now occupies over  after purchase of surrounding properties.

The school expanded in 2013 with the addition of a new library and eight new classrooms attached to the main building. In 2019 the  Kahlig-Cowie Convocation Center & Mother Adele Chapel opened, providing space for athletics and faith.

Central Catholic is one of the oldest high schools in San Antonio, and it counts many prominent business and political leaders among its alumni. It was the first all-boys school in San Antonio and remains one of the largest all-male schools in Texas. Historical Marker #788 on the school's front lawn describes the school's history and denotes it as a Texas landmark.

Mascot
The Central Catholic mascot is the Buttons which are the hard, round segments that comprise the rattle of the rattlesnake. The mascot pays tribute to St. Mary's University, of which the high school was originally a part of, whose mascot is the Rattler.

Athletics

Central competes in the Texas Association of Private and Parochial Schools (TAPPS). For the 2008-2010 alignment, Central is in Division I District 2 for Winter Soccer and 11 Man Football and 6A District 2 in Baseball, Swimming, Track and Field, Golf, Tennis, and Basketball. Central competes in Cross Country in the TAPPS 6A division.

Notable alumni

 William J. Bordelon, 1938, posthumous recipient of Medal of Honor at Battle of Tarawa, 1943
Josef Centeno, chef, restaurateur, and cookbook author
 Henry Cisneros, 1964, mayor of San Antonio, 1981-89, HUD Secretary 1993-97
 Ben Dunn, 1982, American comic book artist and founder of Antarctic Press in San Antonio, TX.
 Nicholas Gonzalez, 1994, actor
 Sonny Melendrez, 1964, Radio Hall of Famer, TV host, actor, writer, and motivational speaker
 Jose Menendez, 1987, member of the Texas State Senate for District 26
 Jim Oertling, 1960, musician, Rockabilly Hall of Fame, Louisiana Folklife Center’s Hall of Master Folk Artists
 Whitley Strieber, 1963, author, screenwriter, UFO abductee

Notable faculty
 John Hamman

References

External links

Catholic secondary schools in Texas
Educational institutions established in 1852
High schools in San Antonio
Boys' schools in Texas
Marianist schools
1852 establishments in Texas